Renier "Walla" Schoeman (born 27 May 1983) is a South African rugby union player, currently playing with the . His regular position is prop.

Career

References

South African rugby union players
Living people
1983 births
Pumas (Currie Cup) players
Leopards (rugby union) players
Griquas (rugby union) players
SWD Eagles players
Border Bulldogs players
Rugby union props
Rugby union players from Limpopo